Enallagma pollutum, the Florida bluet, is a species of narrow-winged damselfly in the family Coenagrionidae. It is endemic to the eastern United States.

The IUCN conservation status of Enallagma pollutum is "least concern", with no immediate threat to the species' survival. The population is stable.

References

Further reading

External links

 

Coenagrionidae
Odonata of North America
Insects of the United States
Endemic fauna of the United States
Insects described in 1861
Taxa named by Hermann August Hagen
Articles created by Qbugbot